Cytochrome P450 2C18 is a protein that in humans is encoded by the CYP2C18 gene.

Function 

This gene encodes a member of the cytochrome P450 superfamily of enzymes. The cytochrome P450 proteins are monooxygenases which catalyze many reactions involved in drug metabolism and synthesis of cholesterol, steroids and other lipids. This protein localizes to the endoplasmic reticulum but its specific substrate has not yet been determined. The gene is located within a cluster of cytochrome P450 genes on chromosome 10q24. An additional gene, CYP2C17, was once thought to exist; however, CYP4217 is now considered an artefact based on a chimera of CYP2C18 and CYP2C19.

CYP2C18 also possesses epoxygenase activity: it can attack various long-chain polyunsaturated fatty acids at their double (i.e. alkene) bonds to form epoxide products that act as signaling agents. It metabolizes: 1) arachidonic acid to various epoxyeicosatrienoic acids (also termed EETs); 2) linoleic acid to 9,10-epoxy octadecenoic acids (also termed vernolic acid, linoleic acid 9:10-oxide, or leukotoxin) and 12,13-epoxy-octadecenoic (also termed coronaric acid, linoleic acid 12,13-oxide, or isoleukotoxin); 3) docosahexaenoic acid to various epoxydocosapentaenoic acids (also termed EDPs); and 4) eicosapentaenoic acid to various epoxyeicosatetraenoic acids (also termed EEQs).

While CYP2C19, CYP2C8, CYP2C9, CYP2J2, and possibly CYP2S1 are the main producers of EETs and, very likely EEQs, EDPs, and the epoxides of linoleic acid, CYP2C18 may contribute to the production of these metabolites in certain tissues.

References

External links

Further reading